The 2006 edition of the Züri-Metzgete cycling classic took place on October 1 in a circuit in and around the Swiss city of Zürich. It was part of the 2006 UCI ProTour, and won by Samuel Sánchez. It turned out to be the last running of the Züri-Metzgete race.

General Standings

2006-10-01: Zürich, 241 km.

External links 
Race website 

2006
2006 UCI ProTour
2006 in Swiss sport